Indra Nooyi (née Krishnamurthy; born October 28, 1955) is an Indian-American business executive and former chief executive officer and chairperson of PepsiCo.

She has consistently ranked among the world's 100 most powerful women. In 2014, she was ranked at number 13 on the Forbes list of The World's 100 Most Powerful Women and was ranked the second most powerful woman on the Fortune list in 2015 and 2017. She also serves on the boards of Amazon and the International Cricket Council.

Early life 
Nooyi was born on October 28, 1955, in a Tamil Brahmin family in Madras (now known as Chennai), Tamil Nadu, India. Nooyi did her schooling in Holy Angels Anglo Indian Higher Secondary School in T. Nagar.

Education 
Nooyi received bachelor's degrees in physics, chemistry and mathematics from Madras Christian College of the University of Madras in 1975, and a Post Graduate Programme Diploma from Indian Institute of Management Calcutta in 1976.

In 1978, Nooyi was admitted to Yale School of Management and moved to the United States, where she earned a master's degree in public and private management in 1980.

Career 
Beginning her career in India, Nooyi held product manager positions at Johnson & Johnson and the textile firm Beardsell Ltd. While attending Yale School of Management, Nooyi completed her summer internship with Booz Allen Hamilton. In 1980, Nooyi joined the Boston Consulting Group (BCG) as a strategy consultant, and then worked at Motorola as vice president and Director of Corporate Strategy and Planning, followed by a stint at Asea Brown Boveri.

PepsiCo 
Nooyi joined PepsiCo in 1994, and was named CEO in 2006, replacing Steven Reinemund, becoming the fifth CEO in PepsiCo's 44-year history. Prior to becoming CEO, Nooyi served as president and chief financial officer, beginning in 2001, she was also named to PepsiCo's board of directors. Between February 2000 and April 2001, Nooyi was senior vice president and chief financial officer of PepsiCo. She also served as PepsiCo's senior vice president for corporate strategy and development from 1996 until 2000, and as PepsiCo's senior vice president for strategic planning from 1994 until 1996. Nooyi directed the company's global strategy for more than a decade and led PepsiCo's restructuring, including the 1997 divestiture of Tricon, now known as Yum! Brands. Tricon included companies like Pizza Hut, KFC, and Taco Bell under its umbrella. The financial gains from this spinoff allowed the company to increase the pace of its share buyback strategy, thereby giving it more leverage to pursue future acquisitions without as much shareholder backlash. Nooyi also took the lead in the acquisition of Tropicana in 1998, and the merger with Quaker Oats Company, which also brought Gatorade in 2001. The $3.3 billion acquisition of Tropicana initially faced opposition from other PepsiCo executives and Wall Street critics. Acquiring Tropicana allowed PepsiCo to gain a competitive edge; Tropicana at the time captured 44% of the chilled orange juice segment, the fastest growing segment of the juice market, an especially positive metric when compared to Coca-Cola's Minute Maid which captured less than half of Tropicana's market share. The Quaker Oats Company's ownership of Gatorade was a positive strategic move for PepsiCo, since Gatorade was responsible for 80% of sports drink sales at the time. Similar to the Tropicana acquisition, this strategic move gave PepsiCo leverage against Coca-Cola, owner of Powerade – second in the sports drink segment. PepsiCo's annual net profit rose from $2.7 billion to $6.5 billion.

Nooyi was named on Wall Street Journals list of 50 women to watch in 2007 and 2008, and was listed among Times 100 Most Influential People in The World in 2007 and 2008. Forbes named her the #3 most powerful woman in 2008. In 2014, she was ranked #13 by Forbes. Fortune ranked her the #1 in the list of Most Powerful Women in Business in 2009 and 2010. On October 7, 2010, Fortune magazine ranked her the 6th most powerful woman in the world. In Fortune's Most Powerful Women List of 2015, Nooyi ranked second.

Nooyi's strategic redirection of PepsiCo, called Performance with a Purpose, has been largely successful and involved creating long-term growth while leaving a positive impact on society and the environment. She reclassified PepsiCo's products into three categories: "fun for you" (such as potato chips and regular soda), "better for you" (diet or low-fat versions of snacks and sodas), and "good for you" (items such as oatmeal). Her initiative was backed up with ample funding. She moved corporate spending away from junk foods and into the healthier alternatives, with the aim of improving the healthiness of even the "fun" offerings. In 2015, Nooyi removed aspartame from Diet Pepsi.

As part of Performance with a Purpose, Nooyi also focused on environmental concerns and sustainability, redesigning packaging to reduce waste, conserving water, switching to renewable energy sources and recycling. In 2020, company-operated U.S. facilities are using 100% renewable electricity. The third component of Performance with a Purpose involved creating a culture where workers were encouraged to stay with the company. As one example, Nooyi wrote to the parents of her leadership team and visited their homes to create the personal connection.

Nooyi has stated an intent to develop a line of snacks marketed specifically for women, feeling that it is a hitherto unexplored category. In a radio interview, Nooyi stated that PepsiCo is getting ready to launch products designed and packaged as per women's preferences, and based on behavioral differences in the way men and women consume snacks.

On August 6, 2018, Nooyi stepped down as CEO, and Ramon Laguarta, a 22-year veteran of PepsiCo, replaced her on October 3, as well as becoming a member of the board of directors. However, Nooyi continued to serve as the chairman of the company until early 2019. During her tenure, the company's sales grew 80%. Nooyi served as CEO for 12 years, 7 years longer than the average CEO tenure at large companies according to an Equilar study.

Connecticut public service 
In 2019, Nooyi became the co-director of the newly created Connecticut Economic Resource Center, a public-private partnership with the Connecticut Department of Economic and Community Development. She will help draft the state's new economic development strategy. Nooyi is a resident of Connecticut and a Yale SOM classmate of Connecticut Governor Ned Lamont.

In April 2020, it was announced that Nooyi – along with Yale epidemiologist Dr. Albert Ko – will represent Connecticut on the six-state working group planning for the careful easing of COVID-19 restrictions. Both Nooyi and Ko will also co-chair the Reopen Connecticut Advisory Group.

Nooyi is also the co-chair of Connecticut-based nonprofit organization AdvanceCT.

Remuneration 
While CEO of PepsiCo in 2011, Nooyi earned $17 million, which included a base salary of $1.9 million, a cash bonus of $2.5 million, pension value and deferred remuneration of $3 million. By 2014, her total remuneration had grown to $19,087,832, including $5.5 million of equity.

Awards and recognition 
In January 2008, Nooyi was elected chairwoman of the U.S.-India Business Council (USIBC). Nooyi leads USIBC's Board of Directors, an assembly of more than 60 senior executives representing a cross-section of American industry.

In 2008, she was elected to the Fellowship of the American Academy of Arts and Sciences.

In 2008, Nooyi was named one of America's Best Leaders by U.S. News & World Report.

Nooyi was named CEO of the Year by the Global Supply Chain Leaders Group in July 2009.

In 2009, Nooyi was considered one of "The TopGun CEOs" by Brendan Wood International, an advisory agency.

Fortune magazine has named Nooyi number one on its annual ranking of Most Powerful Women in business for 2006, 2007, 2008, 2009 and 2010.

Nooyi was named to Institutional Investor'''s Best CEOs list in the All-America Executive Team Survey in 2008 to 2011. After five years on top, PepsiCo's Indian American chairman and CEO Indra Nooyi has been pushed to the second spot as most powerful woman in US business by Kraft's CEO, Irene Rosenfeld.

In 2013, Nooyi was named one of the "25 Greatest Global Living Legends" by NDTV. On April 5, 2007, she was awarded the Padma Bhushan award by the President of India Dr.APJ Abul Kalam Azad at the Rashtrapati Bhavan.Forbes magazine ranked Nooyi on the 2008 through 2017 lists of The World's 100 Most Powerful Women.

Nooyi was named one of the "Best CEOs In The World" by the CEOWORLD magazine in 2018.Nooyi was selected as one of the 2019 American Portrait Gala honorees by the Smithsonian's National Portrait Gallery. The oil on canvas work created in 2019 by Jon R. Friedman was commissioned by the museum to be part of the collection.

In 2019 Nooyi received the Bower Award for Business Leadership from the Franklin Institute Awards Program.

In February 2020, Nooyi was honored with the Outstanding Woman in Business award by the League of Women Voters of Connecticut.

In 2021, Nooyi was inducted into the National Women's Hall of Fame.

In 2022, Nooyi was honored with Golden Book Awards.

 Memberships and associations 
Nooyi is a Successor Fellow of the Yale Corporation. She serves as a member of the Foundation Board of the World Economic Forum, International Rescue Committee, Catalyst and the Lincoln Center for the Performing Arts. She is also a member of the Board of Trustees of Eisenhower Fellowships, and has served as Chairperson of the U.S.-India Business Council.

Nooyi serves as an Honorary Co-chair for the World Justice Project. The World Justice Project works to lead a global, multidisciplinary effort to strengthen the Rule of Law for the development of communities of opportunity and equity.

From April 2015 until April 2020, she was a director of Schlumberger Limited.

In June 2016, she was part of the inaugural team on the Temasek Americas Advisory Panel.

In December 2016, Nooyi joined a business forum assembled by Donald Trump to provide strategic and policy advice on economic issues.

In June 2018, Nooyi joined the International Cricket Council Board as the organization's first independent female director.

Since February 2019, Nooyi has been a member of the board of directors at Amazon.

Nooyi also serves as the Class of 1951 Chair for the Study of Leadership at West Point, a Dean's Advisory Council member at MIT's School of Engineering, and a member of the MIT Corporation.

 Philanthropy 
In 2016, Nooyi gifted an undisclosed amount to her alma mater, The Yale School of Management. She became the school's biggest alumni donor in history and the first woman to endow a deanship at a top business school with her gift. Nooyi and her husband Raj donated 187,000 Scholastic books to Connecticut's alliance school districts as part of the Partnership for Connecticut during the COVID-19 crisis.

 Personal life 
Indra married Raj K. Nooyi, president at AmSoft Systems, in 1981. Nooyi has two daughters and resides in Greenwich, Connecticut. Forbes ranked her at the third spot among "World's Powerful Moms" list. She is a devout Hindu who abstains from alcohol and is a vegetarian because of her adherence to the religion's teachings and traditions.

Her older sister Chandrika Krishnamurthy Tandon is a businesswoman and also a Grammy-nominated artist. South Indian Carnatic musician Aruna Sairam is Indra's aunt.

In India, she used to play cricket and was also in an all-girl rock band, where she played guitar.

 See also 
 Indian Americans in the New York City metropolitan area
 List of Yale University people

 References 

 External links 

 PepsiCo corporate biography
 Forbes Profile: Indra Nooyi
 The Pepsi Challenge, profile Indra Nooyi (Fortune)
 Reference for Business: Indra Nooho Leadership Biography
 Video of discussion with Indra Nooyi at the Asia Society, New York, 4/14/2009
 Indra Nooyi  Video produced by Makers: Women Who Make America''
 
 Harvard Business Review: Becoming a Better Corporate Citizen

1955 births
Living people
American chief executives of food industry companies
American people of Indian Tamil descent
Women corporate directors
Boston Consulting Group people
Indian emigrants to the United States
Indian chief executives
Indian Institute of Management Calcutta alumni
Madras Christian College alumni
PepsiCo people
Recipients of the Padma Bhushan in trade and industry
American women chief executives
Yale School of Management alumni
Yale University alumni
American chairpersons of corporations
Indian chairpersons of corporations
20th-century American businesspeople
21st-century American businesspeople
Tamil businesspeople
Johnson & Johnson people
Booz Allen Hamilton people
Motorola employees
American drink industry businesspeople
University of Madras alumni
Indian Tamil people
Businesspeople from Chennai
American people of Indian descent
Indian women chief executives
Indian women business executives
21st-century Indian businesspeople
20th-century Indian businesspeople
21st-century Indian businesswomen
20th-century Indian businesswomen
American chief executives of Fortune 500 companies
Businesswomen from Tamil Nadu
American chief executives
Asia Game Changer Award winners
20th-century American businesswomen
21st-century American women